Mehmood Akhtar is a television actor from Karachi. He appeared in many dramas and sitcoms. His recent appearances are in Mere Khuda, Joru Ka Ghulam, Gul-e-Rana, Mere Meherbaan, Anarkali.

Television 
Selected Television

References 

21st-century Pakistani male actors
Year of birth missing (living people)
Place of birth missing (living people)
Pakistani male television actors
Living people